Chaussée-Notre-Dame-Louvignies is a village of Wallonia and a district of the municipality of Soignies, located in the province of hainaut, Belgium.

With the others villages Casteau, Horrues, Naast, Neufvilles, Soignies (town), and Thieusies,  they compose the municipality of Soignies since 1977.

Gallery 

Former municipalities of Hainaut (province)